Niclas Füllkrug (born 9 February 1993) is a German professional footballer who plays as a forward for Bundesliga club Werder Bremen and the Germany national team.

A Werder Bremen youth product, he started his senior career with the club's reserves. Following appearances with the first team in the Bundesliga and a loan to 2. Bundesliga side Greuther Fürth in the 2013–14 season, he moved to 1. FC Nürnberg. His performances at Nürnberg earned him a move to Hannover 96 in 2016. In April 2019, Füllkrug's return to Werder Bremen for the 2019–20 season was announced.

Club career

Werder Bremen, and Greuther Fürth loan

Füllkrug spent eight years with TuS Ricklingen in the Ricklingen district of Hanover, where he was coached by his father. During his time there he scored an average of 160 goals per season. When he joined Werder Bremen at the age of 14 in summer 2006, he rejected offers from five Bundesliga clubs and Hannover 96.

Having progressed through Werder Bremen's youth system, Füllkrug began his senior career with the club's reserves.

On 24 August 2013, he joined Greuther Fürth on a one-year loan deal. On 2 November 2013, he scored four goals including a 12-minute hat-trick for his new club during a spectacular 6–2 away win at Erzgebirge Aue. Having scored six goals in 18 appearances, he sustained a ligament rupture in his right ankle in a 2–0 win against VfL Bochum which was expected to keep him out of action for three to four weeks.

1. FC Nürnberg
In 2014, Füllkrug joined 1. FC Nürnberg permanently having agreed a "long-term" contract, with a reported duration of three years. Werder Bremen secured an option to re-sign him for a fixed fee.

Hannover 96
Füllkrug joined Hannover 96 on a four-year contract in July 2016. Nürnberg received a reported transfer fee of €2 million plus 1 million in possible bonuses.

He failed to score in his first eight Bundesliga appearances for Hannover 96 but hit a hat-trick against Mainz 05 on 13 January 2018 in a run of goals that got his name mentioned with a call up to the German national squad. He scored 14 goals in his first season with the club.

On 31 August 2018, it was announced that Füllkrug had agreed to a contract extension until 2022. On 30 September 2018, in a match against Eintracht Frankfurt, he was substituted off with an ankle injury, but was able to play in the following match, a 3–1 win against VfB Stuttgart which moved Hannover up from the last place in the league table. He also featured in a 2–2 away draw against Bayer Leverkusen and a 2–1 home defeat against FC Augsburg despite suffering from pain in his knee. He did not play in Hannover 96's loss in the second round of the DFB-Pokal on 30 October due to knee problems relating back to an injury sustained in 2013. Manager André Breitenreiter stated that the issue had been plaguing Füllkrug for years and that the pain was so severe before the cup match that Füllkrug did not feel "safe". After consulting a specialist Füllkrug returned to training on 20 November and started in four consecutive matches.

A few days after Füllkrug missed a match against SC Freiburg due to knee problems, it was announced that the injury was severe and he would likely be out for the rest of the season. The injury required surgery and was revealed to be cartilage damage to his right knee, the third injury of this kind of his career. He previously suffered cartilage damage at Werder Bremen (January 2013, right knee) and 1. FC Nürnberg (March 2015, left knee).

Return to Werder Bremen
In April 2019, it was announced Füllkrug would return to former club Werder Bremen for the 2019–20 season. There were conflicting reports of the fee paid to Hannover 96 with Deichstube reporting €6.3 million plus a possible 500,000 in bonuses and Sportbuzzer claiming 7 million. 1. FC Nürnberg also profited from the transfer through a 10% sell-on clause. On 26 September 2020, he scored his second Bundesliga hat-trick in a 3–1 away win against Schalke 04. In the 2021–22 2. Bundesliga, he scored 19 goals which helped his club to be promoted back to the Bundesliga. In the beginning of the 2022–23 Bundesliga, he scored 10 goals in 14 matches, which urged the German national coach Hansi Flick to call him up for the World Cup in November.

International career
In November 2022, Füllkrug was called up for the Germany national team for the FIFA World Cup 2022 in Qatar. He made his debut in a friendly against Oman as a substitute and scored in the process. Coincidentally, he also became the oldest outfield player to make his debut for Germany in 20 years, aged 29 years and 280 days after Martin Max who was 33 years and 253 days old when he made his debut for Germany in 2002. On 27 November, he scored his first World Cup goal for Germany in a 1–1 draw against Spain. On 1 December, he scored a goal in a 4–2 win over Costa Rica. However, Germany was eliminated from the group stage as they finished third on goal difference.

Personal life
Füllkrug's nickname is "Lücke" (German for "gap") because of his front teeth. He has a wife named Lisa, and a daughter born in 2019. His sister, Anna-Lena, plays as a striker for Hannover 96, while his grandfather Gerd used to play for SV Arminia Hannover.

Following an accident at Werder Bremen's training ground he once ended up hospitalised with the tooth of his teammate wedged in his forehead.

Career statistics

Club

International

Scores and results list Germany's goal tally first, score column indicates score after each Füllkrug goal.

Honours 

Werder Bremen
 2. Bundesliga promotion: 2021–22

Individual
 Bundesliga Player of the Month: September 2022, October 2022

References

External links

 

1993 births
Living people
Footballers from Hanover
German footballers
Germany youth international footballers
Germany international footballers
Association football forwards
Bundesliga players
2. Bundesliga players
3. Liga players
SV Werder Bremen players
SV Werder Bremen II players
SpVgg Greuther Fürth players
1. FC Nürnberg players
Hannover 96 players
2022 FIFA World Cup players
21st-century German people